José Arroyo can refer to:
Joe Arroyo (1955–2011), Colombian singer
Jose Miguel Arroyo (born 1945), former First Gentleman of the Philippines
José Luis Arroyo (born 1987), Puerto Rican footballer
José Miguel Arroyo Delgado (born 1969), Spanish bullfighter
José Miguel Arroyo (politician), Mexican secretary of foreign affairs in 1853
José Francisco Arroyo de Anda, namesake of Doctor Arroyo, Nuevo León municipality in Mexico
Jose Arroyo (writer), two time Primetime Emmy Award for Outstanding Writing for a Variety Series winner

See also 

 San José Arroyo Seco, community in San Felipe Jalapa de Díaz municipality in Mexico